Christmas is a public holiday in most countries celebrated on December 25.

Christmas may also refer to:

Places

Australia
Christmas Island, a territory of Australia in the Indian Ocean
Christmas Island (Tasmania), one of the group of New Year Islands

Canada
Christmas Island, Nova Scotia, an island within the Bras D'Or Lakes, Nova Scotia, Canada

United States
Christmas, Arizona, an uninhabited mining community
Christmas, Florida, a small town
Christmas, Michigan, a small community
Christmas, Mississippi, an unincorporated community
Christmas Knob, an elevation in Oneida County, New York

Music
Christmas, a 1983–early 1990s American rock band featuring members of Combustible Edison

Albums
Christmas (Alabama album), 1985
Christmas (Bill Anderson album), 1969
Christmas (Bruce Cockburn album), 1993
Christmas (Chris Isaak album), 2004
Christmas (Clay Walker album), 2002
Christmas (Don McLean album), 1991
Christmas (Elaine Paige album), 1986
Christmas (Francesca Battistelli album), 2012
Christmas (Hillsong album), 2001
Christmas (Jaci Velasquez album), 2001
Christmas (Johnny Reid album), 2009
Christmas (Jorma Kaukonen album), 1996
Christmas (Kenny Rogers album), 1981
Christmas (Kevin Kern album), 2012
Christmas (Kimberley Locke album), 2007
Christmas (Mannheim Steamroller album), 1984
Christmas (Michael Bublé album), 2011
Christmas (Michael W. Smith album), 1989
Christmas (The Oak Ridge Boys album), 1982
Christmas (Old Man Gloom album), 2004
Christmas (Rebecca St. James album), 1997
Christmas (Rockapella album), 2000
Christmas (Sons of the San Joaquin album), 1998
Christmas (Sparrow Records album), 1988
Christmas (Stephanie Mills album), 1991
Christmas: God With Us, by Jeremy Camp, 2012
Christmas... From the Realms of Glory, by Bebo Norman, 2007
Christmass (album), by Frank Black, 2006
Christmas, by Don Moen, 1990
Christmas, by the Gothard Sisters, 2010
Christmas, by Jill Phillips, 2010
Christmas, by Mark Feehily, 2017
Christmas, by Plus One, 2002
Christmas, by Till Brönner, 2021

EPs
Christmas (Creeper EP), 2017
Christmas (Delta Goodrem EP), 2012
Christmas (Jesu EP), 2010
Christmas (Low EP), 1999
Christmas (Pet Shop Boys EP), 2009
Christmas, by Bryan Adams, 2019
Christmas, by Jimmy Eat World, 2004
The Christmas EP, by Hey Monday, 2011

Songs
"Christmas" (song), by The Who from Tommy, 1969
"Christmas (Baby Please Come Home)", by Darlene Love, 1963; covered by many performers
"Christmas", by Lil Gotit from Hood Baby, 2018

People named Christmas
Christmas (surname), a surname (and list of people with that surname)
Christmas Evans (1766-1838), was a Welsh Nonconformist minister. 
Christmas Humphreys (1901-1983), British barrister, judge, Shakespeare scholar, and Buddhist
Earle Christmas Grafton Page (1880-1961), Australian prime minister

Fictional characters
Christmas, a fictional character in Kurau Phantom Memory
Christmas Jones, a fictional character in the James Bond movie The World Is Not Enough
Chrissy Snow or Christmas Snow, a fictional character played by Suzanne Somers in Three's Company

Television episodes
"Christmas" (Brooklyn Nine-Nine), 2013
"Christmas" (Divorce), 2016
"Christmas" (The Middle), 2009

See also

Christmas carol
Christmas beetle, Australian genus of beetle (Anoplognathus)
Christmas Bird Count, a census of birds in the Western Hemisphere
Christmas Bowl, an annual Japanese American high school football championship game
Christmas Bullet, an aircraft
Christmas Christmas, a 2017 album
Christmas Day (disambiguation)
Christmas Eve (disambiguation)
Christmas Hills, Victoria, a town in Victoria, Australia
Christmas Island (disambiguation)
Christmas and holiday season
Christmas lights
Christmas music
Christmas tree
Christmas worldwide
Christmas truce, a list of truces during World War I
Christmastide, a season in the liturgical year of most Christian denominations
Factor IX or Christmas factor, a blood clotting protein
Haemophilia B or Christmas disease
 
 
Merry Christmas (disambiguation)
White Christmas (disambiguation)
Xmas (disambiguation)